Acanthocercus minutus, the blue-headed tree agama, black-necked agama, southern tree agama, or  blue-throated agama, is a species of lizard in the family Agamidae. It is a small lizard found in Ethiopia and Kenya.

References

Acanthocercus
Reptiles described in 1957
Taxa named by Wolfgang Klausewitz